Dağlı is a municipality and village in the Quba Rayon of Azerbaijan. It has a population of 2,243.

References

Populated places in Quba District (Azerbaijan)